Giselle González may refer to:

 Giselle González (beauty pageant titleholder), Panamanian beauty pageant contestant, winner of the Señorita Panamá 1992 title
 Giselle González (producer), Mexican telenovelas producer